Aloys Kwaakum (born 9 September 1987) is a Cameroonian football player who is currently out of contract after being released by Belgian 1st division side Lierse.

Kwaakum is a versatile right-sided midfielder or defender.  He began his career at youth level with the academy Ecole de Futbol Brasseries de Cameroun before playing three seasons in the Cameroonian first division with PWD Bamenda and then Racing Club Bafoussam.  After featuring in a youth tournament in Toulouse, France he was eventually taken to Belgium in 2007.  He played one season with TSV Lyra before attracting the attention of Belgian Pro League team Lierse S.K. During his time with Lierse he trialled with several other Belgian clubs, despite interest he chose to see out his contract at Lierse.

References

1987 births
Living people
Cameroonian footballers
Lierse S.K. players
People from Lier, Belgium
Association football defenders
Association football midfielders